The N Broadway Express is a rapid transit service in the B Division of the New York City Subway. Its route emblem, or "bullet," is colored , since it uses the BMT Broadway Line in Manhattan.

The N operates at all times between Ditmars Boulevard in Astoria, Queens, and Stillwell Avenue in Coney Island, Brooklyn, via the BMT Astoria Line in Queens, Broadway Line in Manhattan, the south side of the Manhattan Bridge, and the BMT Fourth Avenue and Sea Beach Lines in Brooklyn. North of 57th Street, limited rush hour service operates via the Second Avenue Subway, originating and terminating at 96th Street on the Upper East Side of Manhattan instead of Ditmars Boulevard.

During the daytime on weekdays, the N runs express between 34th Street–Herald Square in Manhattan and 59th Street in Brooklyn and local elsewhere. Local service in Manhattan is provided by the R and W, which is internally staffed and scheduled as part of the N. Select rush-hour N trains in the reverse-peak direction provide regular express service in Manhattan but stop at DeKalb Avenue and operate local on the Fourth Avenue Line in Brooklyn. Weekend daytime service is the same as weekday service, except that the N makes all stops in Manhattan between Herald Square and Canal Street. During late nights, the N makes all stops along its entire route and uses the Montague Street Tunnel to travel between Manhattan and Brooklyn.

The N was originally the Brooklyn–Manhattan Transit Corporation's 4 service, running along the BMT Sea Beach Line to the Manhattan Bridge. The 4 used the BMT Nassau Street Line in Lower Manhattan from 1915 to 1917, after which it ran express on the BMT Broadway Line. The 4 became the N in 1961. The N ran local in Queens along the IND Queens Boulevard Line to Forest Hills–71st Avenue from 1976 until 1987, when it switched terminals with the R. From 1986 to 2004, reconstruction on the Manhattan Bridge forced the N to run local on the Broadway Line via the Montague Street Tunnel.

Service history

Before 1970
1967–1979 bullet
The route that is now the N was originally BMT service 4, known as the Sea Beach Line or Sea Beach Express.

On June 22, 1915, the current BMT Sea Beach Line opened, replacing a street level "el" that branched off of the Fifth Avenue El with the former BMT West End Line. Originally, it used the south tracks of the Manhattan Bridge, which at that time connected to the BMT Nassau Street Line. Trains began running express between Pacific Street and 59th Street with the extension of the Fourth Avenue Line to 86th Street.

On September 4, 1917, the first part of the BMT Broadway Line and the north side tracks of the Manhattan Bridge opened. Trains ran from 14th Street–Union Square to Coney Island–Stillwell Avenue, now using the bridge's northern tracks. On January 15, 1918, service was extended to Times Square–42nd Street.

Weekday and Saturday summer trains leaving Coney Island between 6:37 a.m. and 8:37 p.m. began running non-stop between Kings Highway and 59th Street on August 1, 1920. Trains that started at Kings Highway made local stops. On November 14, 1920, weekday rush hour trains, and Saturday AM rush hour trains began skipping Myrtle Avenue and DeKalb Avenue.

Between 1924 and 1926, trains skipped Myrtle Avenue and DeKalb Avenue during weekday rush hours, and on Saturday southbound between 12:01 p.m. and 6:57 p.m. Between 4:30 p.m. and 7:30 p.m. weekdays, and 12:01 p.m. to 6:57 p.m. Southbound on Saturdays, the rear two cars at Canal Street were restricted to boarding only (no exiting the train). In June 1931, trains skipped Myrtle Avenue and DeKalb Avenue between 7 a.m. and 12:30 a.m. weekdays, and between 10:30 a.m. Sunday to 12:30 a.m. Monday. Trains skipped 36th Street during the morning rush hour in the northbound direction. Between 1933 and 1937, the hours in which trains skipped Myrtle Avenue and DeKalb Avenue were 7 a.m. and 12:00 a.m. weekdays.

On June 29, 1950, trains began running express in Brooklyn during late nights. As of June 28, 1951, every other morning rush hour train no longer terminated at Kings Highway.

On May 2, 1957, service was extended north via the express tracks from Times Square to 57th Street–Seventh Avenue, and trains stopped bypassing 36th Street during the AM rush hour. In fall 1959, trains began stopping at DeKalb Avenue during midday hours. Previously, they bypassed DeKalb Avenue at all times except late nights. Beginning on January 1, 1961, trains bypassed DeKalb Avenue during rush hours only. In addition, on weekday and Saturday evenings, late nights, and all day Sundays, they ran local on the BMT Fourth Avenue Line.

The N designation began to appear when R27 subway cars were moved to the service in April 1961.

The NX designation was used for a rush hour peak-direction "super-express" service along the express tracks of the Sea Beach Line, beginning in the AM rush hour at Brighton Beach on the BMT Brighton Line, running through Coney Island, and then following the N route to 57th Street–Seventh Avenue. (Reverse in the PM rush hour.)  This short-lived service began on November 27, 1967 (with the opening of the Chrystie Street Connection) and ended April 12, 1968 due to low ridership. Starting on Monday, April 15, 1968, the five NX trips instead ran as N trips.

On December 31, 1972, all late night trains began running local in Brooklyn. Late weekday evening trains, weekend southbound trains, and northbound early weekday trains began stopping at 53rd Street and 45th Street.

1970–1980
On August 30, 1976, weekday N service was extended north over the BMT 60th Street Tunnel Connection to Forest Hills–71st Avenue to replace the discontinued EE. While many N trains ran the full route from Coney Island to 71st Avenue, via the Manhattan Bridge and Broadway Express, some trains ran local during the rush hours only (southbound in the AM rush hour, and northbound in the PM rush hour) between Whitehall Street–South Ferry in Lower Manhattan and Forest Hills–71st Avenue, which had been the former EE route; these trains were noted with diamond N bullets from 1979. Trains stopped terminating at Kings Highway in the AM rush hour.

On January 24, 1977, as part of a series of NYCTA service cuts to save $13 million, many subway lines began running shorter trains during middays. As part of the change, N trains began running with four cars between 9:30 a.m. and 2:15 p.m. On August 27, 1977, N service was cut back during late nights, only operating between 36th Street and Coney Island. Northbound trains ran express between 59th Street and 36th Street while southbound trains ran local.

1980–1990
On November 26, 1984, evening rush hour trains that terminated at Kings Highway were extended to Coney Island.

Reconstruction of the Manhattan Bridge between 1986 and 2004 disrupted N service, usually rerouting it via the Montague Street Tunnel. On April 26, 1986, the north side tracks (leading to the IND Sixth Avenue Line) were closed and services that normally ran on them were moved to the south side, running via the BMT Broadway Line. Because of the large amount of train traffic now running on those tracks, rush hour and midday N service was rerouted via the Montague Street Tunnel, making local stops in Manhattan and Brooklyn, though evening, night and weekend trains continued to use the bridge and express tracks in Brooklyn. Late evening trains that ran via the bridge also ran local in Brooklyn heading southbound. Six trains only ran between Continental Avenue and Whitehall Street in the AM rush hour, while six trains only ran between Canal Street and Continental Avenue in the PM rush hour. The , which was rerouted from the BMT Brighton Line to the BMT West End Line, replaced the N as the weekday express on the Fourth Avenue Line. Starting on April 28, 1986, one Q train ran to Continental Avenue at 7:05 a.m., and returned in service as an N train, and an N train arriving at Continental Avenue at 3:25 p.m. began returning in service as a B train. These special B and Q trips no longer ran after May 23, 1987.

As part of the New York City Transit Authority's proposed service plan to serve the new Archer Avenue Line upper level, the N would have been extended to Jamaica Center during weekdays. When N trains terminated at 71st Avenue or 57th Street–Seventh Avenue during weekends and evenings, G trains would have been extended to Jamaica Center, and during late nights a G train shuttle would have run between Jamaica Center and Van Wyck Boulevard. This service plan would have allowed E and F trains to remain on the Queens Boulevard mainline toward 179th Street. The final service plan, which took effect on December 11, 1988, had the extension served by E trains, with R trains extended to 179th Street.

The N was switched to Astoria–Ditmars Boulevard, while the  went to Forest Hills–71st Avenue. This was done to give the R direct access to Jamaica Yard; previously, the N had direct access to both Jamaica Yard and Coney Island Yard, and the R, running from Bay Ridge to Astoria, lacked direct access to any yard. This change was intended to improve the appearance and reliability of service on the R, since all trains on the Astoria and Broadway Lines were part of the graffiti-free program. Trains ran via the Manhattan Bridge during late nights and weekends. Some trains began went into service at 86th Street during the AM rush hour put-ins. Between November 23, 1987 and May 13, 1988, one D train arrived at Ditmars Boulevard at 7:12 a.m. and returned in service as an N train.

When the north side of the Manhattan Bridge reopened and the south side was closed on December 11, 1988, the N began running local in Manhattan and via the Montague Tunnel at all times. In order to replace B service to Ditmars Boulevard, additional N service was provided during rush hours. Trains continued to run express in Brooklyn between Pacific Street and 59th Street/Fourth Avenue evenings and weekends.

On June 11, 1990, trains that were put into service at Queensboro Plaza in the PM rush hour were discontinued. Between June 10, 1990 and July 25, 1992, due to construction work in the 60th Street Tunnel, trains had to use a single track. Trains operated either between Ditmars Boulevard and Canal Street, or between 57th Street and Coney Island.

The Transit Authority and politicians pressured the New York State Department of Transportation to resume N train service on the bridge's south side on September 30, 1990, despite warnings from engineers that the structure was unsafe and major repairs still had to be made. Trains ran express on Broadway in Manhattan (stopping at 49th Street) and Fourth Avenue in Brooklyn at all times except late nights (10 p.m. to 5 a.m.). Southbound Brooklyn expresses ran until late evenings on Saturday, not running on Sunday morning any more. Between early morning and early evenings, trains skipped DeKalb Avenue. Several trains after the AM rush hour went out of service at Kings Highway. On December 27, state inspectors forced N service to be rerouted via the Montague Street Tunnel again after discovery of corroded support beams and missing steel plates, running local on its entire route at all times.

1990–2000

In November 1993, before the Manhattan Bridge's renovation was completed, the MTA proposed restoring express N service along the Fourth Avenue Line for a six-month trial period, with the M making local stops between Pacific Street and 36th Street. Some residents of Sunset Park, Brooklyn, opposed the proposal, which they claimed would negatively impact about 7,000 daily riders at the 45th Street and 53rd Street stations. On May 31, 1994, the N began running express in Brooklyn between Pacific Street and 59th Street–Fourth Avenue during weekday midday and rush hours, with the M running local during those times.
From 1994 to May 22, 1995, the southern terminal of the N was 86th Street due to rehabilitation work at Coney Island–Stillwell Avenue. On November 4, 2001, it was cut back again as the terminal's reconstruction project continued.
 
From April 30, 1995 to November 12, 1995, the north side of the Manhattan Bridge was closed during weekday midday and weekends for structural repairs.  Midday N service ran local in Brooklyn, replacing the M, which was cut back from 9th Avenue to Chambers Street. The N continued to run express during rush hours.

2001–2010
On October 28, N service was restored, but Cortlandt Street remained closed until September 15, 2002.

On September 8, 2002, because of the ongoing reconstruction of Coney Island terminal, weekend and late night N service was reduced to a shuttle between 86th and Pacific Streets, running express on the BMT Fourth Avenue Line.

On February 22, 2004, the Manhattan Bridge work was finally completed. The N returned to its full route in Manhattan and Queens at all times, and returned to using the Manhattan Bridge at all times except nights (via Fourth Avenue express, bypassing DeKalb Avenue). On weekdays, N trains ran express between 34th Street in Manhattan and 59th Street/Fourth Avenue in Brooklyn via the Manhattan Bridge, and local elsewhere; several trains ran express on the entire Broadway Line and short-turned at 57th Street–Seventh Avenue or Times Square during the morning rush hour. On weekends, it made local stops in Manhattan, but ran express in Brooklyn, using the Bridge. During late nights, it ran local along its entire route via the Montague Street Tunnel, replacing the  train.

On May 29, 2005, the new Stillwell Avenue terminal was completed, and N service between 86th Street and Coney Island was restored.

However, the handful of short-turn N trains continued to run express in Manhattan.

2011–present
From August 2, 2013 to September 14, 2014, the Montague Street Tunnel was closed for Hurricane Sandy-related repairs. During this time, overnight N service was rerouted via the Manhattan Bridge, skipping six stations it normally served.

On November 7, 2016, the MTA restored the BMT Broadway Line services to their 2004–2010 service pattern in preparation for the rerouting of the  train to the Second Avenue Subway. As a result, the N train once again became a weekday express between 34th Street–Herald Square and Canal Street, with local service replaced by the restored W train. The MTA approved the service change on May 23, 2016. All short-turn N trains that originally terminated at 57th Street–Seventh Avenue were extended to 96th Street–Second Avenue on January 3, 2017 following the opening of the Second Avenue Subway.

In January 2017, the MTA revealed plans to rehabilitate the tunnel structure above the BMT Fourth Avenue Line's express tracks between 36th Street and 59th Street. As a result, from July 30, 2018 to July 29, 2019, N trains ran local along that section at all times. Between October 21, 2019 and May 4, 2020, N trains terminated at 86th Street so work could be completed to protect Coney Island Yard from flooding. An out-of-system transfer was available between the N at 86th Street and the F at Avenue X station.

The N began running local in Manhattan in March 2020 after the W was temporarily suspended due to the COVID-19 pandemic; regular N and W service was restored in June. In May 2020, the N began operating local along Fourth Avenue on most weekends to provide a transfer to the F at Fourth Avenue–Ninth Street, since the F was suspended south of Church Avenue due to construction on the IND Culver Line. In 2021, the northbound trips to 96th Street-Second Avenue were officially reclassified as Q trains via Sea Beach; the southbound trips from 96th Street-Second Avenue remained unchanged.

Route

Service pattern 
The following table shows the lines used by the N, with shaded boxes indicating the route at the specified times:

Stations 

For a more detailed station listing, see the articles on the lines listed above.

Notes

References

External links 

 MTA NYC Transit – N Broadway Express
 
 

New York City Subway services